This is a list of mollusks observed in the U.S. state of Utah.

Bear Lake springsnail (Pyrgulopsis pilsbryana)
Bifid duct pyrg (Pyrgulopsis peculiaris)
Black Canyon pyrg (Pyrgulopsis plicata)
Black Gloss (Zonitoides nitidus)
Brian Head Mountainsnail (Oreohelix parawanensis)
California floater (Anodonta californiensis)
Carinate Glenwood pyrg (Pyrgulopsis inopinata)
Cloaked physa (Physa megalochlamys)
Coarse Rams-horn (Planorbella binneyi)
Creeping ancylid (Ferrissia rivularis)
Crestless column (Pupilla hebes)
Cross snaggletooth (Gastrocopta quadridens)
Cross vertigo (Vertigo modesta)
V. m. insculpta
V. m. corpulenta
V. m. parietalis
Deseret mountainsnail (Oreohelix peripherica)
Desert springsnail (Pyrgulopsis deserta)
Desert tryonia (Tryonia porrecta)
Eureka mountainsnail (Oreohelix eurekensis)
O. e. eurekensis
O. e. uinta
Fat-whorled pondsnail (Stagnicola bonnevillensis)
Fish Lake physa (Physella microstriata)
Fish Springs marshsnail (Stagnicola pilsbryi)
Freshwater snail (Fossaria techella)
Freshwater snail (Fossaria modicella rustica)
Glass physa (Physa skinneri)
Glossy valvata (Valvata humeralis californica)
Great Basin rams-horn (Helisoma newberryi)
Green River pebblesnail (Fluminicola coloradoensis)
Hamlin Valley pyrg (Pyrgulopsis hamlinensis)
Kanab ambersnail (Oxyloma kanabense)
Lamb rams-horn (Planorbella oregonensis)
Lance aplexa (Aplexa elongata)
Land snail (Nesovitrea electrina)
Longitudinal gland pyrg (Pyrgulopsis anguina)
Lyrate mountainsnail (Oreohelix haydeni)
Mellow column (Columella columella alticola)
Mexican coil (Helicodiscus eigenmanni)
Mill Creek mountainsnail (Oreohelix howardi)
Minute gem (Hawaiia minuscula minuscula)
Mitered vertigo (Vertigo concinnula)
Montane snaggletooth (Gastrocopta pilsbryana)
Mountain marshsnail (Stagnicola montanensis)
Mud amnicola (Amnicola limosus limosus)
New Zealand mud snail (Potamopyrgus antipodarum) - not native and considered invasive
Ninemile pyrg (Pyrgulopsis nonaria)
Northwest Bonneville pyrg (Pyrgulopsis variegata)
Oregon floater (Anodonta oregonensis)
Otter Creek pyrg (Pyrgulopsis fusca)
Ovate vertigo (Vertigo ovata)
Prairie fossaria (Fossaria bulimoides)
Protean physa (Physella virgata)
P. v. virgata
P. v. berendti
P. v. concolor
Pygmy fossaria (Fossaria parva)
Quagga mussel (Dreissena bugensis) - considered an invasive species, found in Lake Powell and suspected of being in Deer Creek Reservoir
Red-rimmed melania (Melanoides tuberculata) - not native and considered invasive
Ribbed dagger (Pupoides hordaceus)
Rocky Mountain duskysnail (Lyogyrus greggi)
Rustic ambersnail (Succinea rusticana rusticana)
Santa Rita ambersnail (Succinea grosvenori grosvenori)
Sharp sprite (Promenetus exacuous)
Sierra ambersnail (Catinella stretchiana)
Slim snaggletooth (Gastrocopta pellucida parvidens)
Sluice snaggletooth (Gastrocopta ashmuni)
Smooth Glenwood pyrg (Pyrgulopsis chamberlini)
Southern Bonneville pyrg (Pyrgulopsis transversa)
Southern tightcoil (Ogaridiscus subrupicola)
Striate disc (Discus shimekii)
Striate gem (Hawaiia minuscula neomexicana)
Sub-globose snake pyrg (Pyrgulopsis saxatilis)
Swamp lymnaea (Lymnaea stagnalis appressa)
Tapered vertigo (Vertigo elatior)
Texas glyph (Glyphyalinia umbilicata)
Thickshell pondsnail (Stagnicola utahensis)
Thin-lip vallonia (Vallonia perspectiva)
Utah physa (Physella utahensis)
Utah roundmouth snail (Valvata utahensis)
Variable vertigo (Vertigo gouldii)
Western pearlshell (Margaritifera falcata)
Wet rock physa (Physella zionis)
White-lip dagger (Pupoides albilabris)
Widelip pondsnail (Stagnicola traski)
Widespread column (or Moss chrysalis snail) (Pupilla muscorum)
Winged floater (Anodonta nuttalliana)
Yavapai mountainsnail (Oreohelix yavapai)

References

Mollusks
Utah